Thomas Lathrop Bunting (April 24, 1844 – December 27, 1898) was an American businessman and politician who served one term as a U.S. Representative from New York from 1891 to 1893.

Biography 
Born in Eden, New York, Bunting was educated in the common schools and the Griffith Institute, Springville, New York.
He taught school in winters and attended the academy in summer months.
Illness having interrupted his preparation for college, he moved to Hamburg, New York, in 1868 and later established a general mercantile store.
He engaged in the canning business.

Congress 
Bunting was elected as a Democrat to the Fifty-second Congress (March 4, 1891 – March 3, 1893).
He declined to be a candidate for renomination in 1892.

Later career and death 
He resumed the canning business and also became interested in farming, dairying, and stock raising.

He died in Buffalo, New York, December 27, 1898.
He was interred in Forest Lawn Cemetery at Hamburg, New York.

References

1844 births
1898 deaths
People from Eden, New York
Democratic Party members of the United States House of Representatives from New York (state)
People from Hamburg, New York
19th-century American politicians